Naa Illu is a 1953 Telugu-language film produced and directed by V. Nagayya. The story was written by Devulapalli Krishnasastri.

The film had two dance sequences and full-length Hindi songs sung by Meena Kapoor.

Plot
The story is based on innocent people cheated by rich people. This film is about an ideal man called Sivaram (Nagayya), who lives happily with his wife (Raja Kumari) and two children. They like music very much and want to make their children musicians and singers. He is a responsible bank employee by profession. He goes to Bombay for a financial transaction and gets money. He is trapped by Dhanaraj (Lingamurthy) and gets into the attraction of beautiful Leela (Vidhyavathi). He loses the bank money and gets into jail. By the time he returns, the family conditions are poor. He is even prepared to do some dirty jobs for the sake of his family. His children get encouragement from Balananda Sangham and shine. He gets out of his problems and rejoins the family.

Cast

Telugu version
 V. Nagayya as Sivaram
 B. Jayamma
 T. R. Rajakumari
 Mudigonda Lingamurthy as Dhanraj
 Girija
 Vidhyavathi (debut) as Leela
 Rama Sharma
 Chhaya Devi
 Doraiswamy

Tamil cast
The list was compiled from The Hindu review article and from the database of Film News Anandan.

Male cast
V. Nagayya
T. S. Balaiah
V. Gopalakrishnan
Master Sudhakar
T. E. Krishnamachari

Female cast
T. R. Rajakumari
Vidyavathi
Girija
Chaya Devi

Tamil version En Veedu
The Tamil version of the film was made separately with a significantly different cast, character names and locations.

The Tamil film was censored on 16 January 1953 and was 17245 feet in length.

Production
Both Telugu and Tamil versions of the film were directed by V. Nagayya, who also produced the films under the banner Our India Films. Chandilyan wrote the dialogues. Vidyavathi, whose real life name was Ambujavalli, who was the younger sister of actress Sandhya (mother of J. Jayalalitha, played a supporting role in her debut. There were two dance sequences for which the songs were in Hindi, both sung by Meena Kapoor of Bombay. Choreography was done by Satyam. The film was shot at Vauhini and Revathi studios and was processed at Vijaya Lab.

Soundtrack

Telugu soundtrack

Tamil soundtrack
Music was composed by V. Nagayya assisted by A. Rama Rao. Lyrics were penned by Papanasam Sivan, Surabhi, Kashyap and Mohan.

Reception
Film historian Randor Guy wrote in 2009 that the film, despite its good story and performance by Nagayya and others, was not successful at the box office.

References

 Naati 101 Chitralu (Telugu hit films released between 1931–1965), S. V. Rama Rao, Kinnera Publications, Hyderabad, 2006, pages: 84-5.

External links
 

1953 films
1950s Telugu-language films
1950s Tamil-language films
Indian black-and-white films
1950s multilingual films
Indian multilingual films
Indian musical drama films
1950s musical drama films
Films scored by Nagayya
Films scored by A. Rama Rao